Songs from the Pink Death is the fourth studio album by composer and producer Kramer, released on February 17, 1998, by Shimmy Disc and Knitting Factory Records. The album features backup musicians including drummer Damon Krukowski of Galaxie 500 and guitarist Sean Eden of Luna. The album is replete with obscure and obvious references such as to "Sunday Morning" in "Don't Come Around", John Malkovich's character's theory in The Convent in "The Opium Wars Have Long Ceased", and the sample from "Wipe Out (instrumental)" in "The Pink Death Song of Love". The album also includes a cover of The Beatles' "You've Got to Hide Your Love Away".

Track listing

Personnel 
Adapted from Songs from the Pink Death liner notes.

Musicians
 Sean Eden – guitar
 Kramer – vocals, guitar, bass guitar, keyboards, mellotron, tape, percussion, production, engineering
 Damon Krukowski – drums

Production and additional personnel
 D. Bias – design
 Michael Macioce – photography
 Jed Rothenberg – assistant engineer
 Steve Watson – assistant engineer

Release history

References

External links 
 Songs from the Pink Death at Discogs (list of releases)

1998 albums
Albums produced by Kramer (musician)
Kramer (musician) albums
Shimmy Disc albums